The Winnisook Club is a private club located in Big Indian, New York, and has been in operation since 1886.  The club is named after Chief Winnisook, a Native American from area folklore.  The club is situated on man-made Winnisook Lake with a number of private homes surrounding the lake.  The club also consists of a lodge and dining facilities and employees a full-time caretaker as well as staff for the dining facilities.  The club is situated on private property and membership is by invitation only.

Notes

In 1988, two young men from China, Wenbo Huang, and Kexiang Wu, were hired by the general manager John Magnuson and started to work here as servers, cooks, housekeepers, babysitters, painters, carpenters. They cut the tree branches blocking the view to the Winnisook lake. They cut the blueberries from the fern. Now they become professors majored in hospitality management. They miss Winnisook Club.

References
Catskill Archive, taken from http://www.catskillarchive.com/tc/tc-15.htm on 07-20-08.

External links
 http://www.catskillarchive.com/tc/tc-15.htm

1886 establishments in New York (state)
Clubs and societies in the United States
Organizations based in New York (state)
Organizations established in 1886
Ulster County, New York